Amanda Pays (born 6 June 1959) is an English actress. She is known for her roles as Theora Jones in the film and television series Max Headroom and as Christina "Tina" McGee in The Flash and reprised her role in the 2014 series of the same name.

Early life
Pays was born on 6 June 1959 in London, England, the daughter of Jan Miller and Howard Pays, both actors.

Career
Pays made her film debut in Oxford Blues (1984) and she played a French nun, Sister Nicole, in Off Limits (1988 film) with Willem Dafoe, Gregory Hines and Fred Ward. Pays also had a guest role as Phoebe Green in the episode "Fire" (1993) of The X-Files, in the episode "Cindy Plumb" (2006) of Nip/Tuck and in the episode "Black and Tan: A Crime of Fashion" (2008) of Psych, opposite husband Corbin Bernsen.

She also appeared in some early 1980s music videos, including those for "Love Shadow" by Fashion, and "Smooth Operator" by Sade.

Pays is an interior designer and hosts Fine Living Network's Breathing Room.

She made her debut in the dual role of Carla Martin and Christa Bruckner in the 1984 cable film The Cold Room, played Sarah in the 1985 miniseries AD (known as Anno Domini in some releases) and narrated the 1988 documentary Computer Dreams. She also appeared in the low-budget 1987 horror film The Kindred and 1989's Leviathan.

In 1985 she played the part of Nikki South in the television film Minder on the Orient Express, alongside Dennis Waterman and George Cole.

In 2014, Pays was cast in the new The Flash series to play a reimagined version of the character she played in the first series.

Personal life
Pays is the niece of former child actress Mandy Miller (sister of Jan Miller).

Her first marriage, from 1984 to 1987, was to Peter Kohn, the son of producer John Kohn, who later went on to be the production manager for Pirates of the Caribbean, and Barbara Jaffe, the daughter of agent-producer Sam Jaffe. Following her divorce, Pays married American actor Corbin Bernsen on 19 November 1988, with whom she has four sons. Her mother-in-law was long-time The Young and the Restless actress Jeanne Cooper.

Filmography

References

External links

FINE LIVING's Breathing Room

English film actresses
English television actresses
Actresses from London
1959 births
Living people
20th-century English actresses
21st-century English actresses
Jaffe family